The National Security Governmental Council (ex. Government Council for Foreign Affairs and Defence), usually known by its acronym KYSEA (ΚΥΣΕΑ), is the supreme decision-making body on issues of foreign policy and national defence of Greece. It was established in 1986 by initiative of Prime Minister Andreas Papandreou. Since its creation, its composition has changed many times. The president of the council is the prime minister.

Composition 
After the latest overhaul of its membership in July 2012, it comprises:

 the Prime Minister of Greece as chairman
 the Minister for Foreign Affairs
 the Minister for National Defence
 the Minister for Citizen Protection
 the Minister of Migration and Asylum
 the Minister of Maritime Affairs and Insular Policy
 the Minister of Climate Crisis and Civil Protection
 the Chief of the Hellenic National Defence General Staff

The National Security Advisor to the Prime Minister of Greece performs the functions of secretary of the KYSEA.

References 

1986 establishments in Greece
Foreign relations of Greece
Government of Greece
Military of Greece
Greece
Andreas Papandreou